Treg A. Bernt (born March 18, 1976) is an American politician and businessman serving as a member of the Idaho Senate for the 21st district. He assumed office on December 1, 2022.

Early life and education 
Bernt was born and raised in Pocatello, Idaho. He earned a Bachelor of Arts degree in speech communication from Idaho State University.

Career 
Bernt worked as a territory manager for Shaw Industries before founding a flooring business. He also served as a member of the Meridian City Council and president of the City of Meridian Parks & Recreation Commission. Bernt was elected to the Idaho Senate in November 2022.

References 

Living people
Republican Party Idaho state senators
People from Pocatello, Idaho
Idaho State University alumni
People from Meridian, Idaho
People from Ada County, Idaho
People from Bannock County, Idaho
1976 births